Publius Servilius Priscus was a Roman senator active in the fifth century BC and consul in 463 BC.

Family
He was probably the son of Spurius Servilius Structus (consul in 476 BC), and the father of Quintus Servilius Priscus Fidenas, dictator in 435 and 418 BC. Diodorus Siculus gives him the paternal cognomen of "Structus", which was carried by his ancestors, but the name was not given to him by either the Fasti Capitolini or Livy (4.21.9).

Biography
In 463 BC, he was elected consul with Lucius Aebutius Elva as his colleague. They entered office on the first of August, because at the time the consular years began on that day. In the beginning of September, the livestock was stricken by an epidemic, which also afflicted the people. According to Dionysius of Halicarnassus, the epidemic began with the livestock then began to spread throughout the city, killing many people. It entered the city because the peasants took refuge in Rome, bringing their livestock with them. Both Elva and Priscus fell to the pestilence, in that order. The augurs, Manius Valerius Maximus and Titus Verginius Tricostus Rutilus, and Curio Maximus Servius Suplicius Camerinus Cornutus fell to the affliction that year as well.

When the two consuls were found dead, an interrex was given a period of five days to elect new consuls. At the end of the fifth day, elections were not held, and a new interrex took over. Consular elections were held in 462 BC, during the interregnum of Publius Valerius Publicola, resulting in the election of Lucius Lucretius Tricipitinus and Titus Veturius Geminus Cicurinus as consuls.

Notes

Bibliography

Primary sources
 Dionysius of Halicarnassus, Roman Antiquities, Book IX
 Livy, The History of Rome, Books III-IV

Secondary sources
 
 

463 BC deaths
5th-century BC Roman consuls
Roman consuls who died in office
Priscus, Publius
Year of birth unknown